The Devil's Sleep is a 1949 exploitation film directed by W. Merle Connell and produced by George Weiss. Connell had previously directed a number of American burlesque films.  The film looks at juvenile delinquency, phony women's health gyms, and the pushing of narcotics to teenagers.  Using many of the same cast and crew as Test Tube Babies, the film is the first of Timothy Farrell's "Umberto Scalli" trilogy.

Plot
Umberto Scalli has returned from a prison sentence with two lucrative enterprises: a women's health spa that gives the women Dinitrophenol tablets that reduce weight but may have dangerous side effects; and selling Benzedrine to teenagers through a young man who provides them through swinging parties held at a house Scalli owns. Some of the teenagers attempt to pay for their drugs by committing burglaries.  Judge Rosalind Ballentine and Police Detective Sergeant Dave Kerrigan unite to end the menace, but Scalli attempts to blackmail the judge with photographs of her daughter Margie willfully drugged and nude at one of the parties.

Cast
Lita Grey   ...  Judge Rosalind Ballentine  
 William Thomason   ...  Detective Sergeant Dave Kerrigan  
 Will Charles    ...  Inspector Darnell 
Timothy Farrell   ...  Umberto Scalli 
 Fred Smith   ... Tony Donardi 
 Muriel Gardner   ...  Ruby McKenzie 
 Jim Tyde   ...  Bob Winter 
 Stan Freed   ...  Hal Holmes 
 Tracy Lynne   ...  Margie Ballantine 
John Mitchum  ...  Intern  
George Eiferman as Himself

See also
 List of films in the public domain in the United States

References

External links
 

1949 films
American black-and-white films
1949 crime drama films
1940s exploitation films
American teen drama films
1940s teen drama films
American crime drama films
American exploitation films
1940s English-language films
1940s American films